The 2014 Lorraine Open 88 was a professional tennis tournament played on outdoor clay courts. It was the eighth edition of the tournament which was part of the 2014 ITF Women's Circuit, offering a total of $100,000 in prize money. It took place in Contrexéville, France, on 30 June–6 July 2014.

Singles main draw entrants

Seeds 

 1 Rankings as of 23 June 2014

Other entrants 
The following players received wildcards into the singles main draw:
  Alix Collombon
  Mathilde Johansson
  Constance Sibille
  Laura Thorpe

The following players received entry from the qualifying draw:
  Lara Michel
  Mandy Minella
  Gaia Sanesi
  Lina Stančiūtė

The following player received entry by a protected ranking:
  Akgul Amanmuradova

Champions

Singles 

  Irina-Camelia Begu def.  Kaia Kanepi 6–3, 6–4

Doubles 

  Alexandra Panova /  Laura Thorpe def.  Irina-Camelia Begu /  María Irigoyen 6–3, 4–0, ret.

External links 
 2014 Lorraine Open 88 at ITFtennis.com
 Official website 

Contrexeville
Grand Est Open 88
2014 in French tennis
June 2014 sports events in France
July 2014 sports events in France